Frederick George Cotman (14 August 1850 Ipswich–1920) was an English painter of landscapes, portraits and interiors and a member of the Norwich School of painters.

Life 

Frederick was born into the Cotman family of artists. His parents were Henry Edmund Cotman (1802–1871), formerly a Norwich silk merchant and his wife Maria Taylor (1813–1895). His elder brothers, Henry Edmund Cotman (1844–1914), and Thomas Cotman (1847–1925) were born in London before the family moved to Ipswich. Frederick  was born at 186 Wykes Bishop Street, Ipswich in 1850 and was the youngest child of the family He was the nephew of John Sell Cotman and the cousin of John Joseph Cotman and Miles Edmund Cotman. He was a private pupil of William Thomson Griffiths, the Head of Ipswich School of Art.

Cotman links with the Norwich School of painters arise mainly because of his family connection with John Sell Cotman, who was one of its leading artists. However he never lived in Norfolk, unlike so many of the artists of the school.

He worked in both oil and watercolours. His best known work, One of the Family, is now held by the Walker Art Gallery in Liverpool. Throughout his career, which was generally spent in London, he created over thirty paintings. He was a founder member of the influential Ipswich Art Club, and remained a member of it all his life.

Cotman died in Felixstowe on 16 July 1920.

References

Bibliography

External links 

Works by Frederick George Cotman in the Norfolk Museums Collections
Frederick George Cotman – Suffolk Artists website
Works by Frederick George Cotman at ArtUK.

1850 births
1920 deaths
Artists from Ipswich